Fawaz Awana Ahmed Hussein Al Musabi (born 25 November 1988), known as Fawaz Awana, is an Emirati footballer who plays as a midfielder for Baniyas.

Club career

Baniyas

2010–11 season
In this season was his debut with the first team. On 2 September 2010, in the game against Al Dhafra, Fawaz made his official league debut for the first team  when he came on as a substitute for Haboush Saleh in the 90th minute. After a month, on 9 October, he followed with another match also as a substitute in the Etisalat Cup against Al Nasr.

2011–12 season

Personal life
Fawaz is Theyab brother, who died in a traffic accident.

Career  Statistics

Club

References

External links
Baniyas SC profile
  Theyab Awana at proleague.ae
 

1988 births
Living people
Emirati footballers
Baniyas Club players
Al-Nasr SC (Dubai) players
Al Wahda FC players
People from Abu Dhabi
UAE Pro League players
Association football midfielders